Zmiiv or Zmiyiv, Zmiev, or Zmeev, also known as Gotwald from 1976 to 1990, is a city in Chuhuiv Raion, Kharkiv, Ukraine. It hosts the administration of Zmiiv urban hromada, one of the hromadas of Ukraine.

The town is located 42 km from Kharkiv.

Until 2020, Zmiiv was the administrative centre of Zmiiv Raion, before it was merged into Chuhuiv Raion as part of that year's administrative reform.

Toponymy 
The name Zmiiv or Zmiyiv is almost certainly derived from the Ukrainian word for snakes, Zmiji. In addition, there are at least five potential origins for the source of the name Zmiiv or Zmiev:

 There is an old legend that in the dense forests and impenetrable swamps surrounding the town, there lived a winged many-headed serpent, the Zmii Horynych, who was harnessed to a large plough by Nikita Kozhemyak, and the Zmiiv ramparts were formed from the dump of this plough;
 A large number of reptiles lived in the surrounding swamps and forests;
 Not far from the current Zmiiv was the capital of the Polovtsy - Sharukan, which was called змиевой in Russian, which somewhat translates to "city of the serpent" in English.
 The so-called Serpent's Wall, the remains of ancient defensive structures originating in the 10th century to protect middle Dnieper Ukraine from pecheneg and cuman raids. In the area of ​​Zmiiv, transport highways are laid along some ramparts.

The Serpent's Wall is recognized by most historians as the most likely source for the name of Zmiiv.

History 

The oldest settlement at the location of modern-day Zmiiv dates back to the 1st millennium BC. The area around Zmiiv saw numerous different people groups during its history, such as the Scythians, Sarmatians, Goths, Huns, Alans, Avars, Polovtsians, Pechenegs, Tatars, and Slavs.

Igor Svyatoslavich, prince of Novgorod-Seversky, waged wars with the Polovtsy, the Zmiiv settlement founded in 1180-1185 on the Donets at the mouth of the river .

In the mid-1500s an outpost was built there, and in the 1650s the Cossacks built a fort there to defend the vicinity against the Tatars. Zmiiv was a company town of the Kharkiv regiment from 1669 to 1765. It was ravaged by the Tatars in 1688, 1689, and 1692. Its Cossacks took part in the uprisings led by Ivan Dzykovksy (1670) and Kodratii Bulavin (1707–9).

The new wave of settlement of the Wild Field lands, and in particular the lands of the Slobozhanshchina, dates back to the 1630-50s, when thousands of Ukrainians were forced to flee from massacre after unsuccessful revolts against the Polish authorities. 1640 is the official date of foundation of the city. But in the same year, the Tatars seized the city, which was captured by Cossacks Kondratii Sulima. In the 1650s, to the south of the Zmiiv appeared the Zmiiv Nikolaev Cossack Monastery, which was the castle of the old, wounded and other Cossacks. It is believed that the monastery was a treasure chest; it had 6,000 acres of land and numerous buildings. In 1656,  was appointed as governor of Zmiiv by Tsar Alexei Mikhailovich.

At the end of 17th century, the Zmiiv was already a large enough settlement, surrounded by posts: Zamost, Zidki, and Sands. And if for some time he was a part of the Chuguev uyezd, then from 1657 he became the center of the newly created Zmiev uyezd. Sources also mention the weapons of the local fortress: in 1668 it had 7 large cast iron guns, 290 cores and a lot of gunpowder, with 2 shafts surrounding it and a system of underground passages.
In 1688, 1692 and 1736, Tatar attacks were carried out on the city.

The presence of settlements in Slobozhana under the rule of the Russian tsar and the strong oppression on the part of the church and the Cossack elders did not best reflect the mood of the freedom-loving settlers. Thus, in 1668, a rebellion broke out in a number of towns and cities in Slobozhanshchyna, which was headed by Ivan Sirko. During the fighting against government forces, the insurgents burned down the Zmiiv. In several clashes the rebels were defeated, many fled to the Right-bank Ukraine.
2 years later, in 1670, some towns in the Slobozhanshchina supported the rebels under the leadership of Stepan Razin, in particular, there were detachments of Zaporizhzhya and Don Cossacks commanded by Stenka Razin associate, Alexei Khromy. And the Zmiiv became the center of rebellion on the local lands. After the tsarist forces managed to suppress the rebellion, several dozen people were hanged on local roads. According to lord-colonel of Kharkiv cossacks regiment Kvitka, the Tatars' raids have stopped since 1736.

In 1788, the Zmiiv Monastery was destroyed by order of Tsarina Catherine II.

It was an administrative centre of Zmiev uyezd in Kharkov Governorate of Russian Empire.

From 1891 to 1893,  was built here.

A local newspaper is published in the city since November 1930.

Across 1932 and 1933, 559 victims of the Holodomor genocide in Ukraine were identified in Zmiiv and neighbouring , which has since been absorbed into the city.

During World War II, Zmiiv was occupied by the German army from 22 October 1941 to 17–18 August 1943.

Between 1976 and 1990, the town was renamed to Gotwald after Klement Gottwald, a Czechoslovak politician.

Zmiiv was the administrative centre of Zmiiv Raion, until 18 July 2020, when the raion was abolished as part of the as part of the administrative reform of Ukraine, which reduced the number of raions of Kharkiv Oblast to seven. The area of Zmiivk Raion was merged into Chuhuiv Raion.

Demographics
The population as of 1971 was 16,600. By January 1989, it had grown to 20,031 people. In 2001, it was 17,063, and in January 2013, the population was 15,211.

Symbols
The current coat of arms of the Zmiiv may have been around as long as 220 years, used since at least the second half of the eighteenth century, if not as far back as 1803. The coat of arms is an example of a canting arms, as it depicts a serpent with a golden crown on its head.

On 21 September 1781, the coat of arms of the city was not officially approved by the Senate of the Russian Empire and Catherine II in one day with all the coat of arms of the county cities and the provincial centre of Kharkiv and Voronezh governorships, because the Zmiiv was not then a county town.

The coat of arms is "old", that is, historical, and made long before its approval. A distinctive feature of the "old" coats of arms was the only field of the shield - with the coat of arms of the city itself (without the coat of arms of the governorate / provincial center at the top). It was officially approved on 21 September 1803 personally by Tsar Alexander I.

The red box of the coat of arms depicts a "golden serpent twisting upwards and a crown worn on its head" showing the name of the city and the abundance of snakes in the vicinity.

In 1863 K Kene drafted the emblem of the city: On a red shield a golden serpent twisting in a pillar; in the free part of the shield the coat of arms of Kharkiv province; the shield is topped with a silver tower crown and surrounded by gold spikes connected by an Alexander ribbon.

On the coat of arms of the city of the 18th century, the artist depicted a creeping snake, unlike the coat of arms of the beginning of the 19th century, which depicts a standing snake. The modern coat of arms was approved by the City Council in the 1990s. It, like the coat of arms of the early 19th century, depicts a snake standing.

Geography

Economy

The  is the largest company in town. It also has a large agricultural sector with a dairy plant, food-processing plant, as well as several dairy and pig farms.

The "Mayak" enterprise, which produces heating boilers, was founded in 1991.

Transportation
The station is served by a commuter rail known as elektrichka, connecting Kharkiv, Merefa, and Izium with intermediate stops.

Zmiiv has a bus station, which serves as a terminus for local bus routes. Zmiiv also has a regular bus connection with Kharkiv.

Sports
Zmiiv has one football club playing in the Kharkiv Oblast Premier League, FC Mashynobudivnyk Zmiiv.

Points of interest
 Ionospheric Observatory of the Institute of ionosphere

Monuments

Gallery

Notable residents
 Zakhar Slyusarenko, Soviet Army
 Igor Volk, cosmonaut and test pilot
 Ruslan Polovinko, helicopter pilot and lieutenant, awarded the title of National Hero of Azerbaijan
 Ivan Deriuhin, Soviet modern pentathlete and Olympic Champion
 Serhiy Pylypchuk, footballer
 Yevhen Murayev, is a pro-Russian Ukrainian politician and media owner. He is the current leader of the political party Nashi.

References

External links
 Towns of Kharkiv Region
 Zmiiv portal 
 History of Zmiiv

Cities in Kharkiv Oblast
Kharkov Governorate
Cities of district significance in Ukraine
Cities and towns built in the Sloboda Ukraine